Stephen Mirrione (born February 17, 1969) is an American film editor. He is best known for winning an Academy Award for his editing of the film Traffic (2000).

Life and career
Mirrione was born in Santa Clara County, California. He attended Bellarmine College Preparatory and then the University of California, Santa Cruz, from which he received his bachelor's degree in 1991. He moved to Los Angeles, and began a collaboration with Doug Liman, who was then a graduate student at the University of Southern California School of Cinematic Arts. Mirrione edited Liman's first feature films Getting In (1994), Swingers (1996), and Go (1999), which was an homage to Akira Kurosawa's 1950 film Rashomon.

Mirrione has had a notable collaboration with director Steven Soderbergh. The two met when Soderbergh attended the opening of Go. About one year later, he asked Mirrione to edit Traffic (2000), which earned Mirrione an Oscar. Todd McCarthy characterized the effects of the camerawork and editing: "Soderbergh has given the film tremendous texture as well as a vibrant immediacy through constant handheld operating, mostly using available light, and manipulating the look both in shooting and in the lab. Stephen Mirrione's editing, which gives Traffic a beautifully modulated overall shape, is characterized on a moment-to-moment basis by jump cuts and jagged rhythms. Overall result is far too stylized to call the approach verite, but pic looks far more caught-on-the-run, and therefore far less staged, than all but a few other American films."

Mirrione subsequently edited all three of the Ocean's films directed by Soderbergh and starring George Clooney (Ocean's Eleven (2001), Ocean's Twelve (2004), and Ocean's Thirteen (2007)), as well as The Informant! (2009) and Contagion (2011).

Mirrione won an American Cinema Editors "Eddie" Award in 2006 for his editing of Alejandro González Iñárritu's film Babel, for which he was also nominated for an Academy Award. He has been nominated four times for BAFTA Awards  for editing Traffic, 21 Grams (also directed by Inarritu – 2003), Good Night, and Good Luck (directed by George Clooney-2005), and for Babel.

Mirrione has been selected for membership in the American Cinema Editors.

Selected filmography

Academy Awards and Nominations 
 2000 – Traffic (won) Academy Award Film Editing
 2006 – Babel (nominated) Academy Award Film Editing
 2015 – The Revenant (nominated) Academy Award Film Editing
see: Academy Award for Best Film Editing

Other Awards and Nominations 
 2000 – Traffic (nominated)  BAFTA Film Award Best Editing
 2000 – Traffic (nominated)  American Cinema Editors ACE Eddie Best Edited Feature Film – Dramatic
 2002 – Thirteen Conversations About One Thing (won)  San Diego Film Critics Society SDFCS Award Best Editing
 2003 – 21 Grams (nominated)  BAFTA Film Award Best Editing
 2005 – Good Night, and Good Luck (nominated)  BAFTA Film Award Best Editing
 2005 – Good Night, and Good Luck (nominated)  American Cinema Editors ACE Eddie Best Edited Feature Film – Dramatic
 2006 – Babel (won) Cannes Film Festival Vulcain Prize – Awarded to a technical artist by the C.S.T.
 2006 – Babel (nominated)  BAFTA Film Award Best Editing
 2006 – Babel (won)  American Cinema Editors ACE Eddie Best Edited Feature Film – Dramatic
 2010 – Biutiful (nominated)  25th Goya Awards Best Editing
 2013 – August: Osage County (nominated)  American Cinema Editors ACE Eddie Best Edited Feature Film – Comedy or Musical
 2014 – Birdman or (The Unexpected Virtue of Ignorance) (nominated)  BAFTA Film Award Best Editing
 2014 – Birdman or (The Unexpected Virtue of Ignorance) (nominated)  American Cinema Editors ACE Eddie Best Edited Feature Film – Comedy or Musical
 2015 – The Revenant (nominated)  BAFTA Film Award Best Editing
 2015 – The Revenant (nominated)  American Cinema Editors ACE Eddie Best Edited Feature Film – Dramatic

References

External links
 

American film editors
1969 births
Living people
University of California, Santa Cruz alumni
Best Film Editing Academy Award winners
American Cinema Editors
People from Santa Clara County, California
USC School of Cinematic Arts alumni